The Dewey Marsh is a state wildlife area in Portage County, Wisconsin, United States.

Geography
The Dewey Marsh is located in central Wisconsin approximately five to ten miles north of Stevens Point (Lat: 44° 38'  33.6", Lon: -89° 33'  40.6") in the center of the town of Dewey.

History
The Dewey Marsh began its early days as a hunting and fishing trading post with the local Native Americans. The Dewey Marsh was later purchased by the Wisconsin Department of Natural Resources to preserve its wetland heritage. The Dewey Marsh suffered a great fire in 1974, which burned in the bogs until 1976.

Today, the Dewey Marsh is noted for its public lands and the County's Dewey's Shooting Range.

References

External links
 U.S. Geological Survey Map at the U.S. Geological Survey Map Website. Retrieved August 16th, 2022.

State Wildlife Areas of Wisconsin
Protected areas of Portage County, Wisconsin